Helga Lie (24 June 1930 – 23 June 2019) was a Norwegian politician for the Conservative Party.

She served as a deputy representative to the Parliament of Norway from Vest-Agder during the term 1981–1985. In total she met during 51 days of parliamentary session. Hailing from Lier, she moved to Vennesla with her husband in 1962. In 1969 she campaigned for the first kindergarten in Vennesla. She was a member of Vennesla municipal council, and served as deputy mayor, and Vest-Agder county council.

References

1930 births
2019 deaths
People from Lier, Norway
People from Vennesla
Deputy members of the Storting
Conservative Party (Norway) politicians
Vest-Agder politicians
Norwegian women in politics
Women members of the Storting